

The Roman architectural revolution, also known as the concrete revolution, is the name sometimes given to the widespread use in Roman architecture of the previously little-used architectural forms of the arch, vault, and dome. For the first time in history, their potential was fully exploited in the construction of a wide range of civil engineering structures, public buildings, and military facilities. These included amphitheatres, aqueducts, baths, bridges, circuses, dams, roads, and temples.

A crucial factor in this development that saw a trend to monumental architecture was the invention of Roman concrete (also called opus caementicium), which led to the liberation of the shape from the dictate of the traditional materials of stone and brick.

The development of Roman architecture, however, did not remain limited to these new forms and  materials. An unrelated process of architectural innovation continued unabated, which, although less conspicuous, proved their usefulness for solving structural problems and found their way permanently into Western architecture, such as the lintel arch, the independent corbel, and the metal-tie.

During the Age of Augustus, almost the entire city of Rome was rebuilt causing an influx of craftsman and architects from all across Europe. Emperor Augustus aimed to develop new ideas in the construction of his buildings that would forever defy the limits that were ever thought possible. The Mausoleum in Campus Martius was one of the major monuments built by Augustus during his reign that was made almost entirely of concrete using updated construction techniques. The concrete is used in concentric rings that support the structure of the building like walls. The Theatre of Marcellus was another concrete triumph completed during the Age of Augustus, dedicated to the nephew of the emperor. The brick-faced concrete structure construction  started under Julius Caesar but was completed under Augustus. It was this building that shows the integration of new concrete building techniques of Augustus's architects as opposed to those of Caesar. The Theatre of Marcellus uses a variety of materials that aid in the growth of the concrete revolution using readily available volcanic stones such as Tuscolo tuff and Tufo Lionato as aggregates in pozzolanic concretes.

These newly concocted recipes for concrete provided durability to walls and barrelled vaults as well as a unique aesthetic appeal. The integrated stone and masonry design illustrate a refinement that came with the concrete revolution as a result of the new techniques and styles developed under Augustus. The craftsmanship of the Theatre Marcellus demonstrated a skilled employment as well as rigorous technical supervision.

See also 

Ancient Roman architecture
Roman engineering
Roman technology
Pozzolanic reaction

Footnotes

References

Further reading

External links 
Traianus – Technical investigation of Roman public works (archived 28 May 2008)
The Roman Pantheon: The Triumph of Concrete
Fikret Yegul: Roman Concrete
Roman aqueducts: Types of Opus Caementicium walls (archived 23 February 2007)

Ancient Roman architecture
Architectural history
Concrete